(An Incomplete Education) is an  in one act and nine scenes by Emmanuel Chabrier. The French libretto is by Eugène Leterrier and Albert Vanloo. Composed in 1878–79, the work, which is set in the 18th century, is in a lively, light operetta style in which Chabrier excelled and had perfected in  a year or so earlier. It was much admired by Ravel, Hahn and Messager, among others.

Performance history
The ‘opérette’ was first performed on 1 May 1879 as part of an evening's entertainment organized by the ‘Cercle international’ in the Boulevard des Capucines, with piano accompaniment by Chabrier himself. It was revived in March 1910 in Monte Carlo and on 9 January 1911 at the Théâtre des Arts conducted by Gabriel Grovlez. In December 1918 Jane Bathori mounted the piece at the Théâtre du Vieux-Colombier. The 1924 Paris production by Diaghilev, designed by Juan Gris and conducted by André Messager, had recitatives by Darius Milhaud to replace the spoken dialogue. Milhaud also composed an aria for Hélène based on a melody he found among Chabrier's unpublished manuscripts, Couplets de Mariette.

The first performance at the Paris Opéra-Comique, conducted by Roger Désormière, was on 24 March 1938, and it reached its 50th performance there in April 1946. It has occasionally been revived, though sometimes with Gontran transposed for a tenor.

Roles

Synopsis
The overture quotes from “Lorsque le ciel”, the letter song and “Faisons-nous petits”.

Act 1
Scene 1 and 2

Arriving directly from their (teenage) wedding, the young Count Gontran and his wife Hélène, are both expecting some adult advice from their relations. Their annoyance is interrupted by the arrival of Pausanias, Gontran's tutor. Slightly tipsy, Pausanias explains in song “Ce vin généreux” that the Vin de Roussillon was to blame – he had ended by drinking twelve glasses. Then Pausanias explains although Hélène's aunt is ready to see her, as Gontran's grandfather is ill he can't come to talk to the young man, but has sent a letter instead.

Scene 3

Alone, Gontran reads the letter (in song) which ends by saying that there is nothing Gontran's grandfather can teach him... Gontran hastily pens a letter to Pausanias, asking him to return and give him wedding-night advice.

Scene 4

Hélène enters, and it turns out that her aunt's advice was simply to be kind and obedient to her husband. In a duet “Eh bien, ma chère” they exchange a kiss but realize that there must be something more to being husband and wife...

Scene 5 and 6

Alone again, Gontran gets more irritated, as Pausanias arrives back, hinting that he might be interrupting something. But Gontran complains that Pausanias was engaged to teach him all that a man should know about life. In a buffo duo “Après vous avoir saturé d’hébreu”, Pausanias rejects this, insisting that he has taught Gontran Hebrew, Hindu, algebra, chemistry, Greek, trigonometry, metaphysics, therapeutics, mechanics, dialectics, aesthetics, statistics, mythology, metallurgy, ...and so on. Gontran rebuts "no, a thousand times, that’s not enough!" Finally, Pausanias admits that he doesn't know – he is too busy, and it wasn't on the curriculum. But he promises to find out and return immediately.

Scene 7 and 8

Gontran curses his tutor, but, as a storm gathers, confesses his frustrated feelings in “Lorsque le ciel”; as thunder sounds Hélène rushes into the room her nightdress undone, and explains that she is really frightened of thunder. Gontran is struck by how attractive she looks and tells her the best way to remain calm in a storm is to come closer and hold hands. As their duo “Faisons-nous petits” takes flight they get closer still and kiss more and more – and find the answer to their question.

Scene 9

But they are interrupted as Pausanias returns. Gontran orders him out – asking the indulgence of the audience. After a quick reprise of the previous duo the curtain falls.

Recordings
 Christiane Castelli, Claudine Collart and Xavier Depraz, with orchestra conducted by Charles Bruck (1953).

References
Notes

Sources
Buckle R. Diaghilev. London, Weidenfeld and Nicolson Ltd, 1979.
Delage, Roger, Emmanuel Chabrier. Paris: Fayard, 1999. 
Traubner R. Operetta – a Theatrical History. Oxford University Press, 1983.

French-language operas
Opérettes
1879 operas
Operas by Emmanuel Chabrier
Operas